Clinton Hill (1922–2003) was an American abstract artist who created abstract color compositions on canvas, constructions made from wood and canvas, wood and plastic relief sculptures, collage, woodblock prints and unique assemblages of handmade paper.

Life and work
Born in Payette, Idaho, and raised on a working ranch, Clinton Hill served in the navy during World War II as commander of a minesweeper in the Pacific. Upon his return from service, Hill attended the University of Oregon from which he graduated in 1947. He then moved to New York City, where Hill attended the Brooklyn Museum Art School from 1949 to 1951."The work of Clinton Hill is characterized by a lyrical abstraction which is derived from the painterly tradition of the New York School" In 1951 he left for Paris where he furthered his art studies on the GI Bill at the Academie de la Grande Chaumiere and then on to Florence, Italy where Hill studied painting at the Instituto d'Art Statale."Clinton's Hill's first important works were made in the period after 1950s." Upon returning to NY, Hill prepared for his first solo exhibition at the Zabriskie Gallery. His friend Mark Rothko suggested the name of the show "Ladders and Windows;" and from that exhibit in 1955 forward, Hill had numerous one man shows in both the US and Europe. Clinton Hill has been a part of almost 100 exhibitions over a 55-year period."Hill would expand his interest in physically assertive surfaces and outline into outright sculptural relief" In 1958 Hill traveled to India on a Fulbright scholarship."Since the late eighties he produced pieces with a linear element running through the handmade paper, and sculptural forms utilizing wood, charcoal and oil, sometimes attached to canvas and sometimes freestanding pieces, using similar color balances" For over 20 years he was Professor of Painting at Queens College of the City University of New York.

References

Further reading
 Clinton Hill/Allen Tran Foundation, Clinton Hill: A 50 Year Survey. Melissa Morgan Gallery, Palm Desert, California and Jordan Schnitzer Museum, University of Oregon, Eugene, 2009–2010
 Una Johnson. American Prints and Printmakers. (Doubleday, 1980)
 Jules Heller. Papermaking. (Watson-Guptil, 1978)
 Harriet Janis & Rudi Blesh. Collage. (Chilton Co. 1962)
 Amy Winter. Clinton Hill, 1980–2002. The Godwin-Tembach Museum, Queens College, CUNY
 David Acton. A Spectrum of Innovation: Color in American Printmaking, 1890–1960. Worcester Art Museum 1990.
 Stephan Westfall, Clinton Hill. Marilyn Pearl Gallery, New York, 1988
 Martica Sawin. Clinton HIll. Paintings and Paperworks. Montclair Art Museum, 1981
 Charlotta Kotik. With Paper, About Paper. Buffalo Fine Arts Academy, 1980
 Jane M. Farmer. Paper as a Medium. Smithsonian Institution, 1978

External links
 

1922 births
2003 deaths
American abstract artists
Alumni of the Académie de la Grande Chaumière
United States Navy personnel of World War II
University of Oregon alumni
American expatriates in France